Jesse L. Cooksey (May 23, 1932 – April 3, 2016) was the chairman of the South Carolina Republican Party from 1974-1976.  He presided over the party during the tumultuous period of Richard Nixon's resignation and Gerald Ford's term in office.

References

1932 births
2016 deaths
South Carolina Republicans
State political party chairs of South Carolina